, originally known as , is a Japanese manga series created in 1960 by Shigeru Mizuki. It is best known for its popularization of the folklore creatures known as yōkai, a class of spirit-monster which all of the main characters belong to. This story was an early 20th-century Japanese folk tale performed on kamishibai. It has been adapted for the screen several times, as anime, live action, and video games. The word  in the title is similar to Japanese sound symbolism for a cackling noise but refers to Mizuki's childhood nickname, a mispronounciation of his given name.

Selections of the manga and the theatrical live-action films have been published in English, simply titled Kitaro. The 2018 anime series is streamed with English subtitles as GeGeGe no Kitaro. The publisher of the English manga is Drawn & Quarterly.

Plot

GeGeGe no Kitarō focuses on the young Kitarō—the last survivor of the Ghost Tribe—and his adventures with other ghouls and strange creatures of Japanese mythology. Along with: the remains of his father, Medama-Oyaji (a mummified Ghost tribesman reincarnated to inhabit his old eyeball); Nezumi-Otoko (the rat-man); Neko-Musume (the cat-girl) and a host of other folkloric creatures, Kitarō strives to unite the worlds of humans and Yōkai.

Many storylines involve Kitarō facing off with myriad monsters from other countries, such as the Chinese vampire Yasha, the Transylvanian Dracula IV, and other such non-Japanese creations. In addition to this, Kitarō also locks horns with various malevolent yōkai who threaten the balance between the Japanese creatures and humans.

Some storylines make overt reference to traditional Japanese tales, most notably the folk tale of Momotarō, in which the young hero defends a Japanese territory from demons with the help of the native animals. The Kitarō series  draws a great deal of influence from this story, with Kitarō and his yōkai friends driving a group of Western ghouls away from an island.

While the character of Kitarō in GeGeGe no Kitarō is a friendly boy who genuinely wants the best outcome for humans and yōkai alike, his earlier incarnation in Hakaba Kitarō portrays him as a much more darkly mischievous character. His apparent lack of empathy for humans combined with his general greed and desire for material wealth drives him to act in an unbecoming manner towards the human characters—often deceptively leading them into nightmarish situations or even to hell itself.

Characters

 
 
He is missing his left eye, but his hair usually covers the empty socket. He fights for peace between humans and yōkai, which generally involves protecting the former from the wiles of the latter. When questioned in the 2007 movie, Kitarō responds that he is three hundred and fifty years old. As a member of the Ghost Tribe, Kitarō has an assortment of powers and weapons.
 While his powers are featured prominently in the GeGeGe no Kitarō series, Hakaba Kitarō plays down Kitarō's supernatural abilities. Beyond having the power to travel through hell unharmed with the help of his Chanchanko, as well as the ability to regenerate from almost any injury (as evidenced when his body is recoverable after being dissolved by Johnny in the Fog), his powers are more of deception than of fighting prowess: something much more in line with traditional yōkai characters.
 
 
 Medama-oyaji is Kitarō's father. Once a fully-formed adult ghost, he perished from a disease, only to be reborn out of his decayed body as an anthropomorphic version of his own eyeball. He looks small and fragile, but has a strong spirit and a great love for his son. He is also extremely knowledgeable about ghosts and monsters. He enjoys staying clean, and is often seen bathing in a small bowl. He has a great love for sake.
 In the 2002 Kodansha International Bilingual Comics edition and in Crunchyroll's subtitled version of the 2018 anime, he is referred to as Daddy Eyeball.
 
 
 Nezumi Otoko is a rodent-like yōkai–human half-breed. He has been alive for three hundred and sixty years, and in that time has almost never taken a bath, rendering him filthy, foul-smelling, and covered in welts and sores. While he is usually Kitarō's friend, Nezumi Otoko will waste no time cooking up vile schemes or betraying his companions if he thinks there's money to be had or a powerful enemy to side with. He can immobilize even the strongest yōkai that accost him with a pungent flatulence attack. And, akin to cats and mice, he and Nekomusume cannot stand being around each other.
 Nezumi Otoko first appears in the story "The Lodging House" (rental manga version) as Dracula IV's minion.
 In the 2002 Kodansha International Bilingual Comics edition and in Crunchyroll's subtitled version of the 2018 anime, he is referred to as Ratman.
 
 
 A normally quiet yōkai girl, who shapeshifts into a frightening catlike monster with fangs and feline eyes when she is angry or hungry for fish. Predictably, she does not get along well with Nezumi-Otoko. She seems to harbor a slight crush on Kitarō, who sees her only as a friend. In recent iterations (possibly due to the recent anime phenomenon of fanservice), she is very fond of human fashion and is seen in different outfits and uniforms. She bears some resemblance to the bakeneko of Japanese folklore.
 Neko Musume first appears in the story "Neko-Musume and Nezumi-Otoko" (Weekly Shōnen Magazine version); however, another cat-girl named simply  appears in the earlier stories "The Vampire Tree and the Neko-Musume" and "A Walk to Hell" (rental version).
 In the 2002 Kodansha International Bilingual Comics edition and in Crunchyroll's subtitled version of the 2018 anime, she is referred to as Catchick.
 
  (Japanese)
 Sunakake Babaa is an old yōkai woman who carries sand which she throws into the eyes of enemies to blind them. She serves as an advisor to Kitarō and his companions, and manages a yōkai apartment building. The original sunakake-baba is an invisible sand-throwing spirit from the folklore of Nara Prefecture.
 Sunakake babaa first appears in a cameo as one of many yōkai attending a sukiyaki party in the story "A Walk to Hell" (rental version) before making a more prominent appearance in "The Great Yōkai War" (Shōnen Magazine version).
In the 2002 Kodansha International Bilingual Comics edition and in Crunchyroll's subtitled version of the 2018 anime, she is referred to as the Sand Witch.
 
  (Japanese)
 Konaki Jijii is a comic, absent-minded old yōkai man who attacks enemies by clinging to them and turning himself to stone, increasing his weight and mass immensely and pinning them down. He and Sunakake Babaa often work as a team. The original konaki jijii is a ghost which is said to appear in the woods of Tokushima Prefecture in the form of a crying infant. When it is picked up by some hapless traveller, it increases its weight until it crushes him.
 Konaki Jijii first appears in a cameo as one of many yōkai attending a sukiyaki party in the story "A Walk to Hell" (rental version) before making a more prominent appearance in "The Great Yōkai War" (Shōnen Magazine version).
In the 2002 Kodansha International Bilingual Comics edition and in Crunchyroll's subtitled version of the 2018 anime, he is referred to as Old Man Crybaby.
 
 
 Ittan Momen is a flying yōkai resembling a strip of white cloth. Kitarō and friends often ride on him when traveling. The original ittan-momen is a spirit from Kagoshima Prefecture myth which wraps itself around the faces of humans in an attempt to smother them.
 Ittan Momen first appears in the story "The Great Yōkai War" (Shōnen Magazine version).
 In the 2002 Kodansha International Bilingual Comics edition and in Crunchyroll's subtitled version of the 2018 anime, he is referred to as Rollo Cloth.
 
 
 Nurikabe is a large, sleepy-eyed, wall-shaped yōkai, who uses his massive size to protect Kitarō and his friends. The original nurikabe is a spirit which blocks the passage of people walking at night.
 Nurikabe first appears in a cameo as one of many yōkai attending a sukiyaki party in the story "A Walk to Hell" (rental version) before making a more prominent appearance in "The Great Yōkai War" (Shōnen Magazine version).
 In the 2002 Kodansha International Bilingual Comics edition and in Crunchyroll's subtitled version of the 2018 anime, he is referred to as Wally Wall.
 
 
 Kitarō's old rival, he is depicted as an old man who comes at other people's houses and drinks their tea. He is also a member of the Gazu Hyakki Yagyō, and Nurarihyon has a member he always uses named Shu no Bon.
 
 
 Back Beard is the boss of the Western yōkai and Kitarō's second greatest foe after Nurarihyon. He is loosely based on the bugbear. He is a giant, round shadow with a single large eye in the center and several tentacles extending from his body. He appeared most prominently in the story "The Great Yōkai War", where he rallied all the Western yōkai into a war against the Japanese yōkai. He used his hypnotic powers to make Nezumi Otoko betray Kitarō and later hypnotized Kitarō himself. He has since appeared semi-regularly throughout the franchise.

Media

Kamishibai

Itō's version was called ; the title is generally written in katakana to distinguish it from Mizuki's version of the tale.

According to Itō, her Kitarō was based on local legends describing the same or similar stories.

In 1954, Mizuki was asked to continue the series by his publisher, Katsumaru Suzuki.

MangaKitarō of the Graveyard was published as a rental manga in 1960, but it was considered too scary for children. In 1965, renamed to Hakaba no Kitarō, it appeared in Shōnen Magazine (after one of the editors came across the kashibon and offered Mizuki a contract) and ran through 1970. The series was renamed GeGeGe no Kitarō in 1967 and continued on Weekly Shōnen Sunday (1971), Shōnen Action, Shukan Jitsuwa and many other magazines.

In 2002, GeGeGe no Kitarō was translated by Ralph F. McCarthy and compiled by Natsuhiko Kyogoku for Kodansha Bilingual Comics. Three bilingual (Japanese–English) volumes were released in 2002.

Since 2013, compilation volumes of selected manga chapters from the 1960s have been published by Drawn & Quarterly, with English translations by Zack Davisson and an introduction by Matt Alt in the first compilation volume. Drawn & Quarterly later published a large collection of Kitaro manga under the title Kitaro, with Jocelyne Allen as the translator. Zack Davisson wrote the volume's afterword.

Anime

Seven anime adaptations were made from Mizuki's manga series. They were broadcast on Fuji Television and animated by Toei Animation.

The opening theme to all six series is "Gegege no Kitarō", written by Mizuki himself. It has been sung by Kazuo Kumakura (1st, 2nd), Ikuzo Yoshi (3rd), Yūkadan (4th), Shigeru Izumiya (5th), the 50 Kaitenz (6th) and Kiyoshi Hikawa (7th). The song was also used in the live-action films starring Eiji Wentz. In the first film, it was performed by Wentz' WaT partner Teppei Koike.

In January 2008, the sixth anime series (also produced by Toei) premiered on Fuji TV during the late night hours in the Noitamina block. This anime uses the original manga title, and unlike the usual anime versions, it is closer to Mizuki's manga and is not part of the existing remake canon. It also features a completely different opening theme song ("Mononoke Dance" by Denki Groove) and ending theme song ("Snow Tears" by Shoko Nakagawa).

A seventh series, directed by Kōji Ogawa and written by Hiroshi Ohnogi started airing on Fuji TV on April 1, 2018, to celebrate the anime's 50th anniversary. The series concluded on March 29, 2020, as it entered its final arc, the "Nurarihyon Arc", on October 6, 2019. It streamed on Crunchyroll, making it the first Kitarō anime to be available in North America.

An English dub aired as Spooky Kitaro on Animax Asia. The 2008 anime was released with English subtitles on DVD in Australia.

GeGeGe no Kitarō series

Hakaba Kitarō

Films
 1968 series
 GeGeGe no Kitarō (July 21, 1968) (edited version of eps. 5 & 6)
 1971 series
 GeGeGe no Kitarō: The Divining Eye (July 12, 1980) (edited version of ep. 37)
 1985 series
 GeGeGe no Kitarō: The Yokai Army (December 21, 1985)
 GeGeGe no Kitarō: The Great Yokai War (March 15, 1986)
 GeGeGe no Kitarō: The Strongest Yokai Army!! Disembark for Japan! (July 12, 1986)
 GeGeGe no Kitarō: Clash!! The Great Rebellion of the Dimensional Yokai (December 20, 1986)
 1996 series
 GeGeGe no Kitarō: The Great Sea Beast (July 6, 1996)
 GeGeGe no Kitarō: Obake Nighter (March 8, 1997)
 GeGeGe no Kitarō: Yokai Express! The Phantom Train (July 12, 1997)
 2007 series
 GeGeGe no Kitarō: Japan Explodes!! (December 20, 2008)
 2018 series
 Kitarō Tanjō: Gegege no Nazo (2023)
Other
 Yo-kai Watch Shadowside: Oni-ō no Fukkatsu (December 16, 2017) — Crossover film with the Yo-kai Watch series

Live-action films
In recent years, the franchise has seen the release of two live-action films. The first of these was released in 2007, simply titled Kitaro for its international release (the film retained the title of ゲゲゲの鬼太郎 in Japan), and is based on stories depicted in the original Kitarō manga. It stars Eiji Wentz as Kitarō and Yo Oizumi as Nezumi Otoko.

The film follows Kitarō as he tries to save a young high school girl, Mika Miura, while also trying to stop the powerful "spectre stone" from falling into the wrong hands. While previous media in the franchise depicted its characters and stories mostly through hand-drawn animation and illustration, the live-action film makes extensive use of practical costumes and CG characters to depict the cast of yōkai.

The second film, Kitaro and the Millennium Curse, was released in 2008 and sees Wentz returning to the role of Kitarō. It follows Kitarō and his friends as they try to solve a 1000-year-old curse that threatens the life of his human companion Kaede Hiramoto.

Video games
 Gegege no Kitarō: Yōkai Daimakyō for the Famicom (1986, Bandai)
 Gegege no Kitarō 2 for the Famicom (1987, Bandai)
 Gegege no Kitarō: Fukkatsu! Tenma Daiō for the Super Famicom (1993, Bandai)
 Gegege no Kitarō for the Game Boy (1996, Bandai)
 Gegege no Kitarō: Gentōkaikitan for the Sega Saturn (1996, Sega)
 Gegege no Kitarō: Yōkai Donjara for the Super Famicom (1996, Bandai) (requires Sufami Turbo)
 Gegege no Kitarō: Noroi no Nikuto Katachitachi for the PlayStation (1997, Bandai)
 Hissatsu Pachinko Station Now 5: Gegege no Kitarō for the PlayStation (2000, Sunsoft)
 Gegege no Kitarō for Microsoft Windows (2003, Unbalance)
 Gegege no Kitarō: Ibun Yōkaitan for the PlayStation 2 (2003, Konami)
 Gegege no Kitarō: Kiki Ippatsu! Yōkai Rettō for the Game Boy Advance (2003, Konami)
 Gegege no Kitarō: Gyakushū! Yōkai Daichisen for the PlayStation (2003, Konami)
 Gegege no Kitarō: Yōkai Daiundōkai for the Wii (2007, Namco Bandai)
 Gegege no Kitarō Pachislo slot machine made by Sammy Corporation
 Gegege no Kitarō: Yōkai Daigekisen'' for the Nintendo DS (2008, Bandai)

References

Further reading

External links
 Sakaiminato: The town where you can meet Kitaro
 GeGeGe no Kitarō 2007 TV anime official site 
 Hakaba Kitaro official site 
 Poor Little Ghost Boy|Japanzine by Zack Davisson
 Yanoman Corporation
 "Spooky Ooky" – brief history of Shigeru Mizuki and GeGeGe no Kitaro by Jonathan Clements

 

 
1959 manga
1968 anime television series debuts
1971 anime television series debuts
1985 anime television series debuts
1996 anime television series debuts
2007 anime television series debuts
2008 anime television series debuts
Comedy anime and manga
Dark fantasy anime and manga
Drawn & Quarterly titles
Fuji TV original programming
Japanese animated films
Japanese fantasy comedy films
Japanese mythology in anime and manga
Japanese supernatural films
Kodansha manga
Live-action films based on manga
Manga adapted into films
Noitamina
Shigeru Mizuki
Shōnen manga
Supernatural anime and manga
Toei Animation films
Toei Animation television
Yōkai in anime and manga